Palo Viejo (or, alternatively, Ron Palo Viejo) is a Puerto Rican rum brand.

History
Not much has been publicized about the drink's history; however, it is known that it was at first owned by an Arecibo located company named Barcelo, Marquez y Co., until they sold it to the Serralles Distillery company from Ponce. During the 1980s, Palo Viejo advertised heavily on Puerto Rican television, including a commercial that featured a young Osvaldo Rios as a background painter. Palo Viejo television ads were also prominent during Baloncesto Superior Nacional basketball game transmissions on the island.

On October 21, 2015, the Palo Viejo brand released "Palo Ready", a pouch, ready-to-drink beverage made of different fruits and of Palo Viejo rum, which is available at different supermarkets in Puerto Rico.

Ownership
The Palo Viejo brand is owned by the Destileria Serralles company of Puerto Rico, owners also of the Don Q rum brand.

References

Alcoholic drinks
Puerto Rican brands